United Nations Security Council resolution 628, adopted unanimously on 16 January 1989, after noting an agreement between Angola and Cuba regarding the withdrawal of Cuban troops from Angola, and the tripartite agreement between Angola, Cuba and South Africa, the Council welcomed both agreements, emphasising the importance of both in terms of international peace and security.

The resolution expressed its full support to the agreements, and called for all parties concerned and other Member States to help implement the resolution. It also asked for the Secretary General Javier Pérez de Cuéllar to keep the Council informed on its implementation.

See also
 Angolan Civil War
 Brazzaville Protocol
 Angola–South Africa relations
 Cuban intervention in Angola
 List of United Nations Security Council Resolutions 601 to 700 (1987–1991)
 South African Border Wars
 Apartheid

References
Text of the Resolution at undocs.org

External links
 

 0628
20th century in South Africa
1989 in South Africa
1989 in Africa
1989 in Angola
1989 in Cuba
 0628
 0628
 0628
 0628
Angola–South Africa relations
January 1989 events